North Dakota wine refers to wine made from grapes grown in the U.S. state of North Dakota. North Dakota was the last state in the United States since Prohibition to license a commercial winery. The first bonded commercial winery in North Dakota, Pointe of View Winery, was established on April 17, 2002. Pointe of View Winery has since been joined by a second winery, Dakota Hills Winery, but both wineries focus on wine made from fruits other than grapes. Red Trail Vineyard, North Dakota's largest, makes wines exclusively from its grapes.

See also
 American wine
 List of breweries and wineries in North Dakota

External links
 North Dakota Grape and Wine Association

References

 
Wine regions of the United States by state